Tyrosine-protein kinase HCK is an enzyme that in humans is encoded by the HCK gene.

Function 

The protein encoded by this gene is a protein-tyrosine kinase that is predominantly expressed in hemopoietic cell types, and belongs to the Src family of tyrosine kinases. The encoded protein may help couple the Fc receptor to the activation of the respiratory burst. HCK and the Src family kinases have also been implicated in driving cell survival in drug-tolerant cancer cells.  In addition, it may play a role in neutrophil migration and in the degranulation of neutrophils. Alternate translation initiation site usage, including a non-AUG (CUG) codon, results in the production of two different isoforms, that have different subcellular localization.

Interactions 

HCK has been shown to interact with:

 ADAM15 
 BCR gene, 
 Cbl gene, 
 ELMO1, 
 Granulocyte colony-stimulating factor receptor, 
 RAPGEF1,
 RAS p21 protein activator 1,  and
 RASA3.

References

Further reading 

 
 
 
 
 
 
 
 
 
 
 
 
 
 
 
 
 
 
 

Tyrosine kinases